Reginald Foskett (1909 – 13 November 1973) was the fourth Anglican Bishop of Penrith in the modern era.

Born in 1909 he was educated at Derby School and  Keble College, Oxford and ordained priest in 1933. After Curacies at Gedling and  Mansfield he was Rector at Ordsall followed by service as Rural Dean of Ilkeston. From 1957 he was Provost of St Mary's Cathedral, Edinburgh before elevation to the Episcopate a decade later: a post he was to hold for only three years, retiring prematurely due to ill-health. A dedicated historian of the church and of African history., he died on 13 November 1973.

Notes

1909 births
People educated at Derby School
Alumni of Keble College, Oxford
Provosts of St Mary's Cathedral, Edinburgh (Episcopal)
Bishops of Penrith
20th-century Church of England bishops
1973 deaths